Peter Snow (born 1938) is a British television and radio presenter.

Peter Snow may also refer to:

 Peter Snow (priest) (died 1598), English Roman Catholic priest and Roman Catholic martyr
 Peter Snow (doctor) (1934–2006), New Zealand general practitioner
 Peter Snow (artist) (1927–2008), English painter, theatre designer and teacher
 P. J. Snow (born 1948), neuroscientist

See also
 Peter Snowe (1943–1973), American politician